Léon Tom (born 25 October 1888, date of death unknown) was a Belgian épée, foil and sabre fencer and bobsledder. He won two silver medals in the team épée competition at the 1920 and 1924 Summer Olympics. He also competed in the bobsleigh event at the 1928 Winter Olympics.

References

External links
 

1888 births
Year of death missing
Belgian male épée fencers
Belgian male bobsledders
Olympic fencers of Belgium
Olympic bobsledders of Belgium
Fencers at the 1912 Summer Olympics
Fencers at the 1920 Summer Olympics
Fencers at the 1924 Summer Olympics
Fencers at the 1928 Summer Olympics
Bobsledders at the 1928 Winter Olympics
Olympic silver medalists for Belgium
Olympic medalists in fencing
Sportspeople from Antwerp
Medalists at the 1920 Summer Olympics
Medalists at the 1924 Summer Olympics
Belgian male foil fencers
Belgian male sabre fencers